Pooja Entertainment is an Indian production and distribution company established by Vashu Bhagnani in 1995. It is located in Mumbai, Maharastra, India. The company is known for Movies such as Coolie no.1, Biwi no.1, Rangrezz, Shaadi no.1 and Jawaani Jaaneman.

Filmography

References

External links 
 

Hindi cinema
Film production companies based in Mumbai
Entertainment companies established in 1995
Mass media companies established in 1995